Timucuy Municipality (In the Yucatec Maya Language: “place of the dove (divine hen)”) is one of the 106 municipalities in the Mexican state of Yucatán containing  (63.15 km2) of land and located roughly 25 km southeast of the city of Mérida.

History
In ancient times, the area was part of the chieftainship of Chakan until the conquest. At colonization, Timucuy became part of the encomienda system, with a series of encomenderos including Pedro Álvarez in 1549, Gaspar Juárez de Ávila in 1565 and Gertrudis Marín in 1724.

In 1821, Yucatán was declared independent of the Spanish Crown. In 1840, Timucuy was joined with the region of Tecoh. On 24 July 1867, Timucuy was established as a town within the jurisdiction of Acanceh Municipality. In 1988, it was designated as head of its own municipality.

Governance
The municipal president is elected for a term of three years. The president appoints Councilpersons to serve on the board for three year terms, as the Secretary and councilors of street lighting, ecology and parks and public gardens.

Communities
The head of the municipality is Timucuy, Yucatán. Other populated communities in Timucuy are Flor de Lluvia, Ixtlé, Jalapa, San Antonio, Siibay Yunkú, Subincancab, and Tekit de Regil. The largest populated areas are shown below:

Local festivals
Every year from the 10 to 15 of April is a fair featuring regional dancing.

Tourist attractions
 Church of San Gaspar
 Hacienda Subinkancab
 Hacienda Tekik de Regil

References

Municipalities of Yucatán